Eagle River Bridge may refer to:
Lake Shore Drive Bridge (Michigan), pedestrian bridge built in 1915
Eagle River Timber Bridge, automobile bridge built in 1990